Gopal Krishna Sarangi is an Indian economist specializing in energy economics, climate change, energy regulations, energy access, etc. He is at present an Assistant Professor at Department of Policy Studies, Teri University.

Education
His doctoral thesis at Teri University was entitled, "Electricity sector regulation and sustainable development outcomes: An analysis of regulatory impact in 12 Indian states for 2001–2010." under the supervision of Professor Arabinda Mishra. He had earlier pursued his Master's in Economics from Ravenshaw University, Odisha.

Selected bibliography

Selected scholarly articles

Book chapters

Publications in magazines and monographs

See also
 List of economists
 Teri University

References

Indian columnists
20th-century Indian economists
Living people
Indian economics writers
Year of birth missing (living people)